Lakkos is the archaeological site of an ancient Minoan settlement on Crete, just south of Archanes.

Archaeology

Artifacts
 Bronze bull figurine
 Bronze chisel

References
Sakellarakis, J. E. Crete Archanes (1991). .

Minoan sites in Crete
Populated places in ancient Greece
Former populated places in Greece